Jeff Benedict is an American author, a special features writer for Sports Illustrated, and a television and film producer. He has written for The New York Times and the Los Angeles Times, and his stories have been the basis for segments on 60 Minutes, 20/20, CBS Sunday Morning, CBS Evening News, the NFL Network, HBO Real Sports, Good Morning America, 48 Hours, and the Discovery Channel.

Biography 

Before becoming a journalist, Benedict was the director of research at the Center for Study of Sports and Society at Northeastern University, where he conducted groundbreaking research on athletes and violence against women.  In graduate school he went on to publish a series of studies on violence against women.  Then, while in law school, he worked as an assistant to the chief prosecutor in the child victims unit at the District Attorney's office in Boston.

In 2002 Benedict ran as a Democrat for U.S. Congress in Connecticut's 2nd congressional district. He lost in the Democratic primary to Joe Courtney.  In 2003, Benedict partnered with Connecticut Attorney General Richard Blumenthal and founded the Connecticut Alliance Against Casino Expansion, a non-profit corporation that led the effort to repeal Connecticut's Las Vegas Nights law.  Benedict also led the effort to prevent Donald Trump and other casino moguls from constructing casinos in Connecticut.

Publications 
Benedict has written 16 nonfiction books.  His most recent book is The Dynasty, the definitive inside story of the New England Patriots which was published by Simon & Schuster/Avid Reader Press in 2021.  In 2018, Benedict co-wrote the #1 New York Times bestselling biography of Tiger Woods.  In 2021, the book was the basis of a 2-part documentary on HBO.  Benedict was an executive producer.  The book is currently being developed into a scripted television series, which Benedict is also executive producing.  In 2016, Benedict wrote the national bestseller QB: My Life Behind the Spiral, the autobiography of Hall of Fame quarterback Steve Young.  He was also a writer and creative consultant for "Steve Young: A Football Life" which was based on the book and aired on the NFL Network in 2016.

Benedict's book My Name Used to be Muhammad is the biography of a fundamentalist Muslim from Nigeria who was persecuted and imprisoned for converting to Christianity. It was a Book of the Year finalist 2013. Also in 2013, he published The System: The Glory and Scandal of Big-Time College Football, co-written with Armen Keteyian. He is also an executive producer for the motion picture "Little Pink House," based on his book Little Pink House which was published in 2009.

Benedict's other books include:
 
 
 
 
 
 
 
 
 
 
 
 
 
 
 The Dynasty. Simon & Schuster. 2020. ISBN 9781982134112

Sources

External links

Benedict's website
Benedict's articles published in Sports Illustrated
Amazon.com listing for Benedict
Benedict's Simon & Schuster author page

1966 births
21st-century American male writers
American business writers
American gambling writers
American Latter Day Saint writers
American legal writers
American sportswriters
Connecticut Democrats
Eastern Connecticut State University alumni
Journalists from Connecticut
Journalists from Virginia
Living people
New England Law Boston alumni
Southern Virginia University faculty
Writers from Connecticut
Writers from Virginia
20th-century American male writers
Latter Day Saints from Connecticut
Latter Day Saints from Illinois
Latter Day Saints from Virginia
20th-century American non-fiction writers
21st-century American non-fiction writers
American male non-fiction writers